The Journal of Materials Chemistry B is a weekly peer-reviewed scientific journal covering the properties, applications, and synthesis of new materials related to biology and medicine. It is one of the three journals that were created after the Journal of Materials Chemistry was split at the end of 2012. The first issue was published in January 2013. It is published by the Royal Society of Chemistry. The other two parts of the Journal of Materials Chemistry family are Journal of Materials Chemistry A and Journal of Materials Chemistry C, which cover different materials science topics. The editor-in-chief for the Journal of Materials Chemistry family of journals is currently Nazario Martin. The deputy editor-in-chief for Journal of Materials Chemistry B is Jeroen Cornelissen, while the executive editor is Sam Keltie.

Abstracting and indexing 
The journal is abstracted and indexed in the Science Citation Index.

See also 
 List of scientific journals in chemistry
 Journal of Materials Chemistry A
 Journal of Materials Chemistry C
 Soft Matter
 Biomaterials Science

References

External links 
 

Chemistry journals
Materials science journals
Royal Society of Chemistry academic journals
Publications established in 2013
English-language journals
Weekly journals